Stardust  is an album by bassist Ron Carter recorded in 2000 and originally released on the Japanese Somethin' Else label with a US release on Blue Note Records.

Reception

The AllMusic review by David R. Adler said "This beautiful, Latin-themed album by bass superpower Ron Carter almost can stand in as a Stephen Scott showcase, for the young pianist's verve and finesse are in evidence from start to finish. Carter reserves plenty of solo room (and a number of melody statements) for himself, however ... When Skies Are Grey contains nothing ambitious or wildly innovative -- just great, accessible music. Fans of Stephen Scott in particular can't miss with this one". On PopMatters, Simon Warner stated "Ultimately When Skies Are Grey, made in the shadow of Carter's wife's death, is a serious accomplishment". On All About Jazz, Michael Fortuna wrote "When Skies Are Grey is an impressive, unique mixture of two electrifying genres from one of jazz's most prolific bassists".

Track listing 
All compositions by Ron Carter except where noted
 "Loose Change" – 7:08
 "Bésame Mucho" (Consuelo Velázquez, Sunny Skylar) – 7:05
 "Caminando" – 7:08
 "Qué Pasa" – 5:30
 "Corcovado" (Antônio Carlos Jobim) – 7:22
 "Cubano Chant" (Ray Bryant) – 6:00
 "Mi Tiempo" – 8:12

Personnel 
Ron Carter - bass 
Stephen Scott – piano
Harvey Mason – drums
Steve Kroon – percussion

References 

Ron Carter albums
2001 albums
Blue Note Records albums